Dominic Edward Cooper (born 2 June 1978) is an English actor known for his portrayal of comic book characters Jesse Custer on the AMC show Preacher (2016–2019) and young Howard Stark in the Marvel Cinematic Universe, with appearances in Captain America: The First Avenger (2011) and the ABC series Agent Carter (2015–16), among other Marvel productions. Cooper played Sky in Mamma Mia! (2008) and its sequel, Mamma Mia! Here We Go Again (2018).

Early in his career, Cooper was cast in significant roles in productions by the Royal National Theatre and Royal Shakespeare Company; he received acclaim for originating the role of Dakin in the 2004 play The History Boys with which, in 2006, he returned to the West End, transferred to Broadway, and adapted to film. Since that time, he has acted in a series of British and American productions, including the acclaimed period pieces An Education (2009) and My Week with Marilyn (2011), as well as action films, such as Abraham Lincoln: Vampire Hunter (2012) and Need for Speed (2014).

Early life and education 
Cooper was born and brought up in Greenwich, London, the son of Julie (née Heron), a nursery school teacher, and Brian Cooper, an auctioneer. He has two brothers, Simon and Nathan, a musician in the band The Modern, a half-brother, James, and a half-sister, Emma. His maternal great-grandfather was film-enthusiast E. T. Heron, who published The Kinematograph Weekly.

Dominic attended John Ball Primary School in Blackheath, London, followed by Thomas Tallis School in nearby Kidbrooke, then trained at the London Academy of Music and Dramatic Art (LAMDA) in Professional Acting, graduating in 2000.

Career 

Cooper first worked in television and film before making his stage debut in Mother Clap's Molly House at the National Theatre in 2001. Cooper was involved in Alan Bennett's play The History Boys, as the character Dakin, from its first reading. He also toured with the production to Broadway, Sydney, Wellington and Hong Kong as well as appearing in the radio and film adaptations of the play. He has had notable roles in the Royal National Theatre's adaptation of the His Dark Materials trilogy where he played the lead character Will Parry, the TV series Down To Earth and Sense & Sensibility.

In 2008, he appeared as Sky in Mamma Mia!, in which he sang several songs. The same year, he appeared opposite Keira Knightley in The Duchess as Charles Grey, 2nd Earl Grey. He starred in films An Education and Freefall in 2009 and also played Hippolytus in Phèdre at the National Theatre alongside Helen Mirren and Margaret Tyzack.

In 2010, he played rock drummer Ben in the film Tamara Drewe, and in 2011 played the leading roles of Latif Yahia and Uday Hussein, Iraqi dictator Saddam Hussein's son in the biographical film The Devil's Double, which was critically acclaimed but criticized for whitewashing and portrayed Milton H. Greene in My Week with Marilyn. 2011 was also the year Cooper first appeared as Howard Stark in the Marvel Cinematic Universe. Initially appearing in the film Captain America: The First Avenger, he reprised his role in the Marvel One-Shot Agent Carter two years later, and in the television series of the same name in 2015 and 2016.

In 2012, he appeared as vampire Henry Sturges in Abraham Lincoln: Vampire Hunter. Around this time, he was cast in the lead role in the unproduced Albert Hughes project Motor City based on the Black Listed script of the same name. In February 2012, he signed on to replace Clive Owen the financial thriller Cities, ultimately leaving Motor City. Cities was cancelled after production delays.

In 2014, he portrayed the main antagonist in two films: Dino Brewster in Need for Speed and Mehmed in Dracula Untold. Cooper depicted James Bond author Ian Fleming in the television mini-series Fleming: The Man Who Would Be Bond in 2014. The next year, he appeared in two films, Miss You Already and The Lady in the Van, a film by Nicholas Hytner, who had previously directed him in the stage adaption of His Dark Materials and both Theatrical and film versions of The History Boys.

Cooper played Jesse Custer, the lead role in AMC's Preacher; the programme debuted in May 2016. He co-starred in the Warcraft film adaptation, which was released in June 2016. In late 2016, he starred in a well-received West End revival of Stephen Jeffreys' 1994 play, The Libertine at the Haymarket Theatre; he played John Wilmot, Earl of Rochester, the role originated on stage by John Malkovich and played by Johnny Depp in the 2004 film.

Cooper reprised his role of Sky in 2018's sequel film Mamma Mia! Here We Go Again.

Personal life 
Cooper shared a flat with James Corden, his co-star in The History Boys and Starter for 10, until Corden started a family with his wife, Julia Carey. Cooper was responsible for introducing Corden to Julia, whom he had known for years and who was working at Save the Children when he and Corden called in one night. He is also the godfather of Corden's first child, Max.

Cooper dated his Mamma Mia! co-star Amanda Seyfried on and off from 2008 to 2009. From 2010 to 2016, he was in a relationship with actress Ruth Negga. They first met in 2009 on the set of the National Theatre's production of Phèdre, and starred opposite each other in other projects including the 2011 short film Hello Carter, the 2016 film Warcraft, and AMC's Preacher (2016–2019). They lived together in London's Primrose Hill. Despite breaking up in 2016, the press first reported the split in April 2018. Cooper has been in a relationship with actress Gemma Chan since 2018.

In August 2014, he was one of 200 public figures who were signatories to a letter to The Guardian expressing their hope that Scotland would vote to remain part of the United Kingdom in September's referendum on that issue.

Filmography

Film

Television

Radio

Theatre credits

Awards and recognition 
Cooper was nominated for a 2006 Drama Desk Award for his work on the Broadway production of The History Boys. Additionally, he received nominations for the British Independent Film Award, British Film Critics' Circle Award, London Critics' Circle Film Award, and an Empire Award for his role in the film adaption of the play.

In 2010, his film An Education received a Screen Actors Guild Award nomination for "Outstanding Performance by a Cast in a Motion Picture". His turn as Sadaam Hussein's son and his body double in The Devil's Double was praised by critics and, in turn, he was nominated for the 2012 Saturn Award for Best Actor.

Cooper's television work has also been recognised; in 2014 he was nominated for a Satellite Award for "Best Actor in a Miniseries or a Motion Picture Made for Television" for Fleming and in 2015 his guest performance as Howard Stark on Agent Carter was nominated for a Saturn Award.

References

External links 

 
 

 eFilmCritic.com interview with Dominic Cooper by Dan Lybarger 
 Dominic cooper interview The Telegraph

Living people
1978 births
20th-century English male actors
21st-century English male actors
English male film actors
English male radio actors
English male stage actors
English male television actors
Male actors from London
Alumni of the London Academy of Music and Dramatic Art
People from Greenwich
Royal Shakespeare Company members
English male Shakespearean actors
Male actors from Kent
English male voice actors